Nullarbor Links is an 18-hole par 72 golf course, said to be "the World's Longest Golf course", situated along 1,365 kilometres of the Eyre Highway along the southern coast of Australia in two states (South Australia and Western Australia), notably crossing the Nullarbor Plain at the head of the Great Australian Bight.

History
The idea for the course came from Alf Caputo and Bob Bongiorno, both active in the Eyre Highway Operators Association, over a bottle of red wine at the Balladonia Roadhouse. Bongiorno wanted to encourage travellers to stop, spend their money and avoid dangerous driver fatigue.

A feasibility study was completed in September 2006, and public play began in August 2009. The course officially opened on 22 October 2009. , more than 20,000 travellers had officially played it, and bought a scorecard for stamping at the roadhouses en route. Course officials have estimated that nearly as many travellers had played the course without paying any fee.

The course
The course begins and ends (depending on the direction of crossing) in the goldmining town of Kalgoorlie, Western Australia and the coastal town of Ceduna, South Australia. Professional golfer Robert Stock, from Manchester, England, consulted on the design that incorporates 7 holes from existing courses and 11 holes created at roadhouses and roadside stops.

The purposely constructed holes have tees and greens that use artificial grass, with natural desert land between.

One of the holes is right in the middle of a sheep station, and has views of the shearing shed as well as the sheep. Other unusual hazards include crows, emus, kangaroos, three species of deadly poisonous snakes, wedge-tailed eagles and wombat holes. A further complication is that the ambient temperatures can reach over  during the day.

Playing the course
The course can be played in either direction. A score card can be purchased in Ceduna or Kalgoorlie for A$70 (as of June 2013). Players can either provide their own clubs, or hire them at each hole for a fee. To preserve the nature of the Nullarbor, players are required to tee their balls up on the course's fairways and are discouraged from driving vehicles on the fairways. On presenting the completed card they can claim a Nullarbor Links Certificate for playing "the World’s Longest Golf course".

Tournaments hosted
The course is the host of the Chasing the Sun golf tournament, which was inaugurated in 2009. The tournament has been held every September since its inception, other than in 2020 and 2021, when it was suspended due to the COVID-19 pandemic.

References

External links
 Nullarbor Links - official website
 Eyre Highway accommodation
 Nullarbor travel information

Golf clubs and courses in Western Australia
Nullarbor Plain
Tourist attractions in Western Australia
Tourist attractions in South Australia
Australia's big things
Big things in South Australia
Sports venues completed in 2009
Golf clubs and courses in South Australia
2009 establishments in Australia